Grindelia confusa is a rare North American species of flowering plants in the family Asteraceae. It is native to northern Mexico, found only low-lying areas in Namiquipa Municipality within the State of Chihuahua.

Grindelia confusa is unusual among Mexican species of the genus in having narrow, lobed leaves with spines at the tips of the lobes. The plant usually produces one flower head one per flower stalk. Each head has 15-20 ray flowers, surrounding a large number of tiny disc flowers.

References

External links
photo of herbarium specimen at Missouri Botanical Garden, collected in Chihuahua in 1936, isotype of Grindelia confusa

confusa
Endemic flora of Mexico
Flora of Chihuahua (state)
Plants described in 1938